St Cuthbert's Swallet is the second longest, and most complex, cave on the Mendip Hills, in Somerset, England. It forms a major part of the Priddy Caves system and water entering this swallet re-emerges at Wookey Hole.
St Cuthbert's Swallet is part of, and lies underneath, the Priddy Pools Site of Special Scientific Interest.

It is named because of its location in the St Cuthbert Out parish of Wells, and was originally called St Cuthbert's Pot.

History 
Interest in the possible existence of a cave at this location existed before 1927, and increased when St Cuthbert's Pool suddenly drained away in that year. Attempts to discover an entrance took place between 1944 and 1953, when entry was finally gained. Exploration continued to push the known limits of the cave throughout the 1950s and 1960s. Sump 1 was passed in 1969. Sump 2 has not yet been passed.

Access 
Due to a still enforceable court injunction dating from 1863, which required that the stream now known to run through the cave to Wookey Hole was not polluted, the cave is locked and access is controlled by the Bristol Exploration Club on behalf of the landowners. No novices are allowed to enter.

Description 

St Cuthbert's Swallet is a classic example of a deep phreatic cave system developed at a depth of not less than  beneath the water table. It contains inclined bedding plane mazes at many levels, fault-guided rifts and some significant chambers. Nine successive phases of sediment deposition, stalagmite deposition and stream erosion have been recognised at the site, providing an exceptional record of environmental change through the warm and cold phases of the Ice Age.

Among its displays are large and impressive calcite groups such as the 'Curtains', 'Cascade', Gour Hall with its  gour, 'The Beehive', Canyon Series and the 'Balcony' formations in September Chamber, perhaps some of the best in Britain.

The cave has also been identified as an important site for the study of cave insects. Most specimens are female but a male specimen was collected from St. Cuthbert's Swallet in 1969.

See also 
 Caves of the Mendip Hills

References

External links 
 

Caves of the Mendip Hills
Limestone caves